Microsoft OneNote is a note-taking software developed by Microsoft. It is available as part of the Microsoft Office suite and since 2014 has been free on all platforms outside the suite. OneNote is designed for free-form information gathering and multi-user collaboration. It gathers users' notes, drawings, screen clippings, and audio commentaries, and notes can also be shared with other OneNote users over the Internet or a network. 

OneNote is also available as a free, stand-alone app via the official website and the app stores of: Windows 10, MacOS, iOS, iPadOS and Android. Microsoft also provides a web-based version of OneNote as part of OneDrive and Office for the web.

Overview 
OneNote was announced by Microsoft's Bill Gates on November 17, 2002. The software allows users to create notes that can include: texts, pictures, tables, and drawings. Unlike a word processor, OneNote features a virtually unbounded document window, in which users can click anywhere on the canvas to create a new text box at that location. OneNote saves data automatically as the user makes edits to their file.

OneNote saves information in pages organized into sections within notebooks. Microsoft designed this user interface to resemble a tabbed ring binder, into which the user can directly make notes and gather material from other applications. OneNote notebooks collect, organize and share possibly unpublished materials – as compared to word processors and wikis, which usually target publishing in some way. The difference shows in certain OneNote features and characteristics:

 Pages can be arbitrarily large
 Images can be inserted
 There is no enforced uniform page layout or structure.

Users can move pages within the binder and annotate them with a stylus or word-processing or drawing tools. Users may add embedded multimedia recordings and hyperlinks. They can also add embeddable content like YouTube videos. OneNote also integrates search features and indexing into a free-form graphics and audio repository. It can search for images (e.g. screen captures, embedded document scans, photographs) for embedded text content. It also searches "electronic ink" annotations as text and phonetically searches audio recordings on a text key. It can replay audio concurrently with notes taken during the recording. It can also extract or copy texts from images and documents using Optical Character Recognition

Its multi-user capability allows offline paragraph-level editing with later synchronization and merging. This allows collaboration among multiple individuals in a notebook when they are offline. More than one person can work on the same page at the same time using OneNote as a shared whiteboard environment.

On March 17, 2014, Microsoft released the OneNote cloud service API that enables third-party application developers to integrate the service into their apps. The API runs on Microsoft's globally available cloud and sends data from applications into the user's OneDrive. OneNote can perform optical character recognition on images of text and can render webpages as snapshot images.

Microsoft also announced several new features in OneNote that use the service API: 
OneNote Clipper: A browser bookmarklet that uses the OneNote service API and enables users to save a screenshot of a webpage to OneNote along with the link. The text in the screenshot is made searchable using Optical Character Recognition.
Email to OneNote: A feature enabling users to send emails to the address me@onenote.com from pre-specified email IDs to have the contents of the email saved to OneNote.

File format 

A OneNote notebook is stored as a folder with a separate data file for each section. A .one file can be a OneNote notebook or a OneNote section. OneNote files have a .one filename extension.

Microsoft upgraded the file format twice after it had introduced OneNote 2003 — first in OneNote 2007, then in OneNote 2010. OneNote 2003 files can be opened by both OneNote 2007 and OneNote 2010 in read-only mode and subsequently upgraded to the later versions of the file format. OneNote 2010 can read and write OneNote 2007 file formats. It can also convert back and forth between the 2010 and the 2007 formats.

Microsoft has documented the OneNote file format. It is an open format that can store varied multimedia content in a single .one file.

Multiple .one files can be exported to a .onepkg file, which stores multiple .one files (corresponding to the individual notebooks) in cabinet file format.

Platform support 
OneNote supports simultaneous editing of shared OneNote documents by multiple users when the document is stored in a shared folder in OneDrive. Dropbox was supported for some time as a sync protocol, but after Windows Live Mesh was discontinued, OneNote supported it for cloud-based storage and synchronization of OneNote files. OneNote clients, including the OneNote web app of Office Online, can view and edit them.

Microsoft made OneNote 2013 for Windows desktop available for free. OneNote for Windows and Mac are both based on a freemium model. Premium features such as SharePoint support, version history and Microsoft Outlook integration were previously available only to Office 365 and Office 2013 customers, but on February 13, 2015, Microsoft removed all feature restrictions, except creation of local notebooks — the free edition only stores notebooks on OneDrive — from the programs, essentially making the program completely free to use.

Windows 
The first version, OneNote 2003, was only sold as a separate product for Windows compatible with Windows XP and Windows 2000 as well as for Microsoft Tablet PCs with pen input. Starting with Office 2007 it was then included as part of the Office suite, as the software was positioned more as a student tool rather than business.

A Microsoft Store version of OneNote (formerly known as OneNote MX) was available for Windows 8 and RT, using OneDrive as a storage place. It is optimized for use on tablets by implementing a pie menu interface and invoking operating system's tablet-specific functionality.

In 2018, Microsoft announced that for OneNote on Windows, the Universal Windows Platform (UWP) based OneNote for Windows 10, would be the default experience for Office users on Windows. The Win32/Win64 "desktop" version would remain known as OneNote 2016 despite the release of Office 2019, would no longer receive new features, and would not be installed with Office by default, but remain available as an option.

However, Microsoft reversed this decision in 2019; in the same year, the company announced that both versions would receive active development and the desktop version would once again be installed with Office by default. The desktop application was renamed to simply OneNote, matching the other programs in Office 365. OneNote is no longer installed with Windows starting from Windows 11, but is still available from Microsoft Store.

In 2021, Microsoft announced that OneNote for Windows 10 would be discontinued and that they were working on migrating users and features to the desktop version. They also announced that it would be receiving some user interface changes to be more in line with Windows 11.

Mobile 
OneNote is also available for cell phones. Microsoft currently has a stand-alone OneNote app for iOS and Android. 

OneNote Mobile for older Windows Mobile smartphones and pocket PCs was included with OneNote 2007. It was released with Windows Phone 7 in 2010. In 2011, OneNote Mobile went multi-platform as it was released for iPhone followed by a version for Symbian as part of Microsoft Apps. In 2012 Microsoft released OneNote for Android in a surprise move.

On July 1, 2013, Microsoft released version 2 of its app for iPad, containing significantly updated features, to correspond more closely to those available on the Windows platform. On August 19, 2014, Microsoft updated OneNote for Android tablets to include handwriting support and touch-friendly navigation. This version supports notebooks stored on OneDrive or SharePoint. In 2022, the Android version got a major refresh.

Mac 
On March 17, 2014, Microsoft released OneNote for Mac. It is compatible with OS X Mavericks and above and can be downloaded for free from the Mac App Store.

Version and licensing differences 
The desktop OneNote and OneNote for Windows 10 have different functionality and user interfaces, which also differ from the versions for other platforms. Compared to OneNote for Windows 10, the desktop OneNote: has a full Office ribbon interface, features the most customization options, runs on multiple versions of Windows, and provides the possibility of local notebook support as opposed to OneDrive cloud storage; it is the only version for any platform to offer the latter feature, even as a paid option.

In addition to the version differences, OneNote features on Windows and Mac vary according to whether it is installed as a free or paid program. If a "compatible" Office license (whether for the subscription Office 365 or the perpetual Office 2019) is present on the machine, the Windows desktop, Windows 10, and Mac versions all unlock additional functionality, which varies depending on the version: the desktop OneNote adds local notebook support, the Mac version adds stickers and OneNote for Windows 10 gains several features including stickers, ink replay, Researcher and Math Assistant. More premium features are in development for the Mac and Windows 10 versions.

Reception 

Christopher Dawson reviewed OneNote 2010, titling his favorable review "OneNote is Office 2010's killer app in education". He speculated that the app would be particularly useful as a tool for student notetaking.

Release history 

All release dates pertain to general availability. Release to manufacturing is usually two or three months in advance. This table only includes editions released for Windows.

See also 
 Comparison of notetaking software

References

Further reading

External links 
 
 OneNote Download link

OneNote
Note-taking software
Screenshot software
IOS software
WatchOS software
Android (operating system) software
Wear OS software
Windows software
Universal Windows Platform apps
Classic Mac OS software
Google Chrome apps
2003 software